Lewis MacKenzie (born 1940) was a Canadian Army major general. General MacKenzie or Mackenzie may also refer to:

Allan MacKenzie (1931–2012), Royal Canadian Air Force lieutenant general 
Colin Mackenzie (Indian Army officer) (1806–1881), Madras Army lieutenant general
Colin Mackenzie (British Army officer) (1861–1956), British Army major general
Donald C. MacKenzie (born 1931), Royal Canadian Air Force major general 
Francis Mackenzie, 1st Baron Seaforth (1754–1815), British Army lieutenant general
George Mackenzie, 2nd Earl of Seaforth (died 1651), Scottish general of the Covenanters in the Wars of the Three Kingdoms
Jeremy Mackenzie (born 1941), British Army general
John Mackenzie, Lord MacLeod (1727–1789), Swedish Army lieutenant general and British Army major general
Ranald S. Mackenzie (1840–1889), Union Army brigadier general and brevet major general